Mary Pickens was a member of the Arizona House of Representatives from January 1995 to January 2003, representing district 14.

References

Democratic Party members of the Arizona House of Representatives